Asovo is a rural locality (a selo) and the administrative center of Asovskoye Rural Settlement, Beryozovsky District, Perm Krai, Russia. The population was 826 as of 2010. There are 14 streets.

Geography 
It is located 25 km south-east from Beryozovka.

References 

Rural localities in Beryozovsky District, Perm Krai